The Young Offenders is an Irish coming-of-age television sitcom, developed by Peter Foott, for RTÉ and BBC Three. Based on the IFTA-winning 2016 film of the same name, the first series began broadcasting on 1 February 2018, to generally favourable reviews. The series follows the lives of Conor MacSweeney and Jock O'Keeffe, lovable rogues from Cork.

The show stars Alex Murphy and Chris Walley as the main characters, reprising their roles of Conor MacSweeney and Jock O'Keeffe from the film, respectively, with supporting roles from Hilary Rose as Mairead MacSweeney, Dominic MacHale as Sergeant Tony Healy, P. J. Gallagher as Principal Barry Walsh, Jennifer Barry as Siobhan Walsh, Demi Isaac Oviawe as Linda Walsh, Orla Fitzgerald as Orla Walsh and Shane Casey as Billy Murphy.

Prior to the six-episode first series coming to an end, the programme was recommissioned for a second series, which was broadcast between 3 November and 8 December 2019, after a Christmas special was released on 14 December 2018, starring Irish actor Robert Sheehan. A third series was broadcast between July and August 2020.

On 3 March 2023, it was confirmed that a fourth series had been commissioned by RTÉ and the BBC, also that the show would move to BBC One in the United Kingdom.

Series overview
The series follows the adventurous and criminalised lives of Cork-based teenagers Conor MacSweeney (Alex Murphy) and Jock O'Keeffe (Chris Walley). Although criminals, the boys both have deep feelings about certain topics, and these views are explained by Conor in his narration at the end of each episode.

The first series reviews Conor and Jock's feud with their school principal, Barry Walsh (P. J. Gallagher), and their relationships with his daughters, Linda (Demi Isaac Oviawe) and Siobhan (Jennifer Barry), respectively. It also sees Conor try to overcome his fear of his first kiss with Linda, or as Jock calls "shifting", as well as seeing Conor's mother Mairéad (Hilary Rose) begin a relationship with Jock and Connor's enemy, Sergeant Tony Healy (Dominic MacHale), the local police officer. Jock's abusive home life with his alcoholic father (Michael Sands) is addressed further, which results in him moving in with the MacSweeneys.

In the second series, Siobhan is heavily pregnant, and Jock and Conor attempt to earn money in many different ways. Conor and Linda are preparing to go to the next stage of their relationship by having sex. However, their plans are affected when Jock's old best friend Gavin, now Conor's arch-enemy, dares Linda to kiss him. Siobhan's mother Orla (Orla Fitzgerald) and Mairéad attempt to build up a friendship between themselves and the two families for the sake of Siobhan’s baby. Principal Walsh tries to show that Jock is not a worthy father by giving him challenges.

Cast and characters

Main
 Alex Murphy as Conor MacSweeney:
Conor is the son of Mairéad MacSweeney (Hilary Rose) and the best friend and subsequent foster brother of Jock O'Keeffe (Chris Walley). Conor's father was killed in an accident at work, where one of his co-workers accidentally dropped a hammer off a roof, hitting him in the face and leading to his death. Conor is the follower of Jock, and takes part in regular crime acts alongside him, and soon begins a relationship with Linda Walsh (Demi Isaac Oviawe), and Jocks dates her sister Siobhan (Jennifer Barry). Conor has a feud with local police officer Sergeant Healy (Dominic MacHale), who is eager to expose Jock for his many crimes, and soon begins a relationship with Mairead.
 Chris Walley as Jock O'Keeffe:
Jock is the best friend and subsequent foster brother of Conor MacSweeney (Alex Murphy). Jock is also known as 'fake Billy', as he purchased a mask from an online shop, who create masks from scratch over a photograph of a person, and commits many crimes, to which he brings Conor's involvement into – mainly stealing bikes and regular various thefts. Jock begins a relationship with Siobhan Walsh (Jennifer Barry), who is the sister of Conor's new girlfriend Linda (Demi Isaac Oviawe). It is established that Jock receives abuse from his alcoholic father, which leads to Mairéad defending him and taking him into her home. At the end of the first series, Jock discovers that Siobhan is pregnant with his child.
 Hilary Rose as Máiréad MacSweeney:
Máiréad is the mother of Conor MacSweeney (Alex Murphy), and the widow of Conor's father. Máiréad gave birth to Conor at the age of 16, which Conor says is "old for their neighbourhood". Máiréad takes in Conor's best friend Jock O'Keeffe (Chris Walley), and fosters him, after she discovers he is receiving abuse from his alcoholic father. She then begins a relationship with local police officer, Sergeant Tony Healy (Dominic MacHale), much to the dismay of Conor and Jock, as Healy is their main enemy, as it is his ambition to expose "fake Billy".
 Dominic MacHale as Sergeant Tony Healy:
Healy is a local Garda  and the long-term enemy of Jock O'Keeffe (Chris Walley) and Conor MacSweeney (Alex Murphy). Healy has the major ambition to expose the identity of "fake Billy" (who is Jock in disguise throughout his crimes), and he has a "cat and mouse chase" with Jock. Healy later begins a relationship with Mairead MacSweeney (Hilary Rose), the mother of Conor, much to the dismay of Conor and Jock.
 Jennifer Barry as Siobhan Walsh:
Siobhan is the daughter of Barry (P. J. Gallagher) and Orla Walsh (Orla Fitzgerald), the sister of Linda Walsh (Demi Isaac Oviawe) and the girlfriend of Jock O'Keeffe (Chris Walley). Siobhan and Linda both receive regular bullying from other students at their school, due to their father's strictness as the principal. Siobhan begins a relationship with Jock, whilst his best friend Conor MacSweeney (Chris Walley) dates her sister Linda (Demi Isaac Oviawe). At the end of the first series, Siobhan discovers that she is pregnant with Jock's child at the age of 15.
 Demi Isaac Oviawe as Linda Walsh:
Linda is the daughter of Barry (P. J. Gallagher) and Orla Walsh (Orla Fitzgerald), the sister of Siobhan Walsh (Jennifer Barry) and the girlfriend of Conor MacSweeney (Alex Murphy). It is clear that she is not biologically related to her family, as she is black whereas her family are all white, which results in Conor asking her about it to a confused response. She and Conor subsequently begin a relationship, but Conor is fearful of their first kiss, and they then decide to have the worst first kiss ever. Linda then helps Siobhan after she learns she is pregnant with Jock's child, and she instructs her to tell Jock.
 P. J. Gallagher as Principal Barry Walsh:
Barry Walsh is the principal of St. Finan's Community School, where Conor MacSweeney (Alex Murphy) and Jock O'Keeffe (Chris Walley) attend, as well as his two daughters Siobhan (Jennifer Barry) and Linda (Demi Isaac Oviawe). It is clear that all students hate Principal Walsh, which sees Siobhan and Linda receive regular bullying for their father's strictness. Principal Walsh feuds with both Conor and Jock for their relationships with his daughters.
 Orla Fitzgerald as Orla Walsh:
Orla is the wife of Principal Barry Walsh (P. J. Gallagher) and the mother of Siobhan (Jennifer Barry) and Linda Walsh (Demi Isaac Oviawe). She is happy about her daughters entering into relationships with Jock O'Keeffe (Chris Walley) and Conor MacSweeney (Alex Murphy), respectively, unlike her husband, who is full of anger at Conor and Jock. She also confronts Barry after insulting Conor during their "friendly" wrestling match in the garden at their barbecue. She also is told by Siobhan and Linda of Siobhan's pregnancy with Jock, and agrees not to tell Barry as he would go angry with his daughter, until Siobhan is ready to tell him after telling Jock.
 Shane Casey as Billy Murphy:
Billy is the local "nut-job", who carries around a knife and regularly mugs locals, including Conor MacSweeney (Alex Murphy). To get revenge on Billy for mugging Conor and stealing his phone, Conor's best friend Jock O'Keeffe (Chris Walley) purchases a mask from an online shop which make masks if you send in a photograph. Jock wears the mask and steals a bicycle belonging to local police officer Sergeant Tony Healy (Dominic MacHale), and is jailed after when they go to his home to question him, they find him in possession of drug plants. When released, Billy follows Jock after he steals alcohol from a local store wearing the "fake Billy" mask, and the security guard who chases after Jock, and asks Billy if he saw fake Billy. Jock takes off the mask after hiding behind a bin and puts up his hood. He follows him onto the bus, and takes hostage of the bus after Healy sees him with a knife in his hand. However, Billy does not know that Jock is "fake Billy", but does ask him if he is him as he is wearing the same grey hoody that "fake Billy" was wearing, but Jock insists he is not "fake Billy".
 Penny and Nola Richardson as Star O'Keeffe:
Infant daughter of Jock and Siobhan, born at the end of season 2.

Recurring
 Chris Kent as Conor's Dad:
Conor's dad is the deceased husband of Mairead MacSweeney (Hilary Rose) and the father of Conor (Alex Murphy). He got Mairead pregnant at the age of 16, which according to Conor was "old for their neighbourhood". When Conor asks Mairead why she fell for his father, she says that he worked every day while she was pregnant with her father making a "ugly" wooden cot for Conor. He died when at work, when one of his co-workers dropped a hammer off of a roof, hitting his face and killing him.
 Cora Fenton as Fiona O'Keeffe:
Jock's mum died years ago when she drowned. The police never found her body, but found her car on the roadside of a lake. She has a memorial stone, which Jock (Chris Walley), his best friend Conor MacSweeney (Alex Murphy), Siobhan (Jennifer Barry) and Linda Walsh (Demi Isaac Oviawe) visited and sang "With or Without You" by her graveside.
 Michael Sands as Jock's Dad:
Jock's dad is the widower of Jock's mum (Cora Fenton). He is an alcoholic and regularly abuses Jock (Chris Walley). Jock's best friend Conor MacSweeney's (Alex Murphy) mother Mairead (Hilary Rose) defends Jock from his father's abuse and takes him in, fostering him, and taking him away from his father's care.

Guest

 Robert Sheehan:
Robert Sheehan is an Irish actor, who is filming for a new film in Cork, as it "has the most unusual people he has ever seen". He takes a certain disliking to both Conor and Jock, as they accidentally get themselves roles in his film, and take hours to film their only scene with Sheehan. Sheehan then decides to angrily protest with the Cork locals, who are campaigning against the council's decision to renovate the council houses, with them fearing that they will never return to their homes. Sheehan does this in order to gain popularity for his career and his new film.
 Roy Keane:
Roy Keane is an Irish footballing legend. He is seen briefly when he tries to order fish and chips from Mairead, Conor and Jock. They tell him to "fuck off" and he walks off. Jock then thinks for a moment, very confused, before rebuffing the thought of it being Keane.

Production

Development
The film, The Young Offenders, was released in 2016 and was generally well-reviewed, winning an Irish Film & Television Award. With the popularity of the film, it was confirmed on 9 May 2017 that a six-episode television programme, based on the film with the same name, had been ordered by RTÉ, to be broadcast in 2018. Creator, Peter Foott commented, "It's incredibly exciting to be able to work with the BBC and with RTÉ to bring these characters back to the screen, they have been so supportive of the project and will be a wonderful home for it. The public response to the film, and specifically the characters themselves, was just so overwhelming that we really felt there were a lot more stories to tell". This series began broadcasting on 1 February 2018, through the online television service BBC Three, and was later broadcast on RTÉ2 in Ireland on 8 February 2018. With a popular and high reception, the series was recommissioned for a second series, although the projected release date was not disclosed for over a year.

In November 2018, it was confirmed that a Christmas special had been produced to conclude the first series with the episode becoming available for streaming via BBC iPlayer from 14 December onwards, whereas television screen broadcasting occurred on Christmas day. In October 2019, with lack of news over past months except cast member Shane Casey posting the front cover of an episode script on his Instagram account, it was reported that the second series would begin broadcasting in November. Days later, the BBC confirmed that the second series would commence on 3 November. It was later confirmed that all six episodes would be available to be streamed through the BBC iPlayer service from the second series' premiere date. The second series was well-acclaimed by critics, which resulted in the BBC recommissioning the programme for a third series, to be broadcast in 2020, shortly after the second series concluded.

In July 2020 it was confirmed that, shortly after a short trailer was released by the BBC promoting the third series' forthcoming release, the third series' entire episode list would be released on 19 July 2020. It was also announced that the programme would be broadcast on a weekly basis on BBC One.

Casting
Upon the confirmation that the programme had been ordered, it was announced that Alex Murphy and Chris Walley would reprise their roles as lead characters Conor MacSweeney and Jock O'Keeffe, respectively. However, through viewing the third episode of the first series, it was shown that Walley's character had officially been renamed for the television series: in the film, the character was nicknamed "Jock", due to him only having one piece of underwear, and his surname was Murphy; whereas in the television programme the character was actually named Jock, with his surname changing from Murphy to O'Keeffe. Furthermore, it was confirmed that Hilary Rose would also be reprising her role from the film, portraying Mairead MacSweeney, the mother of Murphy's character. P. J. Gallagher also returned from the film, though he began portraying the role of Principal Barry Walsh, having portrayed the role of drug dealer Ray in the film, whereas Dominic MacHale and Shane Casey reprised their roles as Sergeant Tony Healy and Billy Murphy from the film, respectively.

New additions to the cast included Jennifer Barry and Demi Isaac Oviawe, who portray the roles of Siobhan and Linda Walsh, the daughters of Principal Walsh; the characters are introduced as love interests for Jock and Connor, respectively. Orla Fitzgerald also joined the cast, portraying the role of Orla Walsh, the wife of Principal Walsh and mother of Siobhan and Linda; she was introduced as a secondary character in the first series though was promoted as a series regular during the second series.

Peaky Blinders star Cillian Murphy was suggested by show producers to Peter Foott as an actor to try and sign on for the second series, and Murphy later told the media that he would be willing to appear in the show if "he was given a good part". In October 2018, it was confirmed that former Love/Hate actor Robert Sheehan had joined the cast in an undisclosed role, after the news was confirmed by Walley during an interview; he portrayed himself in the Christmas special. On 24 November 2018, it was confirmed that a one-off Christmas episode would be broadcast, featuring Sheehan, with the official news that he would only be making a guest appearance in that singular episode. The tradition of celebrities making cameo appearances in the programme continued in the second series, when Irish footballing legend Roy Keane made a brief cameo where the characters attend a Cork City Football Club match as caterers.

Filming
The majority of the first series was filmed at various locations in Cork. It showed the crew filming at numerous historical locations across the city, including the view from Shandon, the English Market, North Mall & the Franciscan Abbey, Kyrl's Quay & Medieval Cork and Saint Fin Barre's Cathedral. The view from Shandon is a scene from both the television programme and film, in which the majority of the programme's scenes are filmed, usually at the beginning and conclusion of episodes.

In September 2018, the cast were seen filming around Cork in costume, with these events being captured on camera by a fan of the show, who in turn uploaded this image to social media. It was initially believed to be filming for the second series, though this proved not to be the case, with it being the Christmas special being filmed in preparation for a December release date.

Principal photography for the second series began in June 2019, with the BBC confirming that production had begun, with them uploading a promotional image of Murphy and Walley in character. Despite the programme's distributors not publicly announcing its recommissioning for a third series, the third series was filmed back-to-back alongside the second series.

Marketing
Scenes from the programme became available on YouTube, which were distributed by BBC Three. The trailer for the second series was released in October 2019.

Episodes

Broadcast

Reception

Critical response
Aoife Kelly of the Irish Independent released a positive review of the programme after the broadcast of the first episode, commenting, "It takes the best of the movie and builds on it". Bruce Dessau stated that the programme was a brilliant show to watch, and that he believed that it had a similar reputation to Channel 4 series Derry Girls, also set in Ireland, with other journalists calling for a crossover to be produced of the two programmes for the future. Some articles reported the show as "heart-warming", with the third episode of the first series receiving generally favourable reviews from fans and critics alike.

Accolades

References

External links
 

2018 Irish television series debuts
2010s crime comedy television series
2010s teen sitcoms
BBC crime television shows
BBC television sitcoms
Cork (city)
English-language television shows
RTÉ original programming
Teenage pregnancy in television
Television series about dysfunctional families
Television series about teenagers
Television shows set in the Republic of Ireland